Benthochromis tricoti is a species of fish in the cichlid family. It feeds on small crustaceans and plankton. Like many other cichlids, it is a mouthbrooder.

"B. tricoti" seen in the aquarium trade are actually B. horii, a species only scientifically described in 2008.

The specific name of this fish honours a Monsieur Tricot, of the Great Lakes Railroad Company in Albertville, for the interest and concern he showed for the Belgian Hydrobiological Mission to Lake Tanganyika during 1946–1947, which collected the type.

References

tricoti
Taxa named by Max Poll
Taxonomy articles created by Polbot
Fish described in 1948
Taxobox binomials not recognized by IUCN